SES-11 / EchoStar 105 is a geostationary communications satellite operated by SES S.A. and EchoStar and designed and manufactured by Airbus Defence and Space.

The spacecraft had been ready to beam television programming and video services across the Americas for SES S.A. and EchoStar. The Falcon 9 launch vehicle has placed the satellite into a high-altitude supersynchronous transfer orbit.

See also 

 SES S.A.
 List of SES satellites

References 

Communications satellites in geostationary orbit
SES satellites
Satellites of Luxembourg
Spacecraft launched in 2017
2017 in Luxembourg
SpaceX commercial payloads
Satellites using the Eurostar bus